The South Wales Geologists' Association (SWGA) is an affiliated local group of the Geologists' Association. It was founded in 1960 (Douglas Bassett and T. R. Owen being amongst the co-founders) and registered as a charity in 1996 (no. 1054303).

Activities
The SWGA's aims are the study and promotion of geology in South Wales. Anyone with an interest in geology and the earth sciences is welcome, professional or amateur. Activities include field trips during the summer season, and lectures at Swansea or Cardiff University's geology departments during the winter season, as well as support for Rockwatch activities for young people and geological events for the public.

In addition, the South Wales Geologists' Association maintains close links with like-minded organisations such as the Pembrokeshire Coast National Park Authority, the Fforest Fawr Geopark, the Southern Wales regional group of the Geological Society, the Wales & West branch of the Russell Society, and the Cardiff Naturalists' Society.

The SWGA is also supportive of initiatives in geoconservation and geodiversity, in particular through their involvement in the creation of the South East Wales RIGS group.

Past Chairmen and presidents

The group was headed by a chairman during the period 1959–1996, and by a president from 1996 onwards.

Past Chairmen

Source : Group of Chairmen 1959–1992, from "GEOLOGISTS’ ASSOCIATION, SOUTH WALES GROUP, A GEOLOGICAL PERSPECTIVE 1960–1992", p. 24–25, Compiled by ALUN J. THOMAS, supplemented from SWGA archives and minutes.

Past presidents

Publications
Publications cater for a range of geological ability and include field guides, geological booklets and guided walks leaflets to areas of interest in South Wales. Amongst them are:

 Michael G. Bassett 1982 Geological excursions in Dyfed, south-west Wales
 Howe, S., Owen, G. & Sharpe, T. 2005 Walking the Rocks
 Dilys Harlow 2014 The Land of the Beacons Way: Scenery and Geology Across the Brecon Beacons National Park

See also 
 Geologists' Association
 Rockwatch

References

External links 
 Geologists’ Association, South Wales Group, a Geological Perspective 1960–1992
 SWGA Facebook page
 SWGA Twitter account

Scientific organizations established in 1960
Geology societies
1960 establishments in Wales
Science and technology in Wales
Geologists' Association